The Redd Road Rural Historic District is a  historic district in Fayette County, Kentucky and Woodford County, Kentucky which was listed on the National Register of Historic Places in 1991.  It is an area largely south and east of the junction of Redd and Frankfort Roads, and included 39 contributing buildings, 10 contributing structures, and 11 contributing sites.

It consists of seven adjoining farmsteads.

References

National Register of Historic Places in Fayette County, Kentucky
National Register of Historic Places in Woodford County, Kentucky
Italianate architecture in Kentucky
Farms on the National Register of Historic Places in Kentucky
Historic districts on the National Register of Historic Places in Kentucky
Roads on the National Register of Historic Places in Kentucky